The 1995 Vuelta a Murcia was the 11th edition of the Vuelta a Murcia cycle race and was held on 1 March to 5 March 1995. The race started and finished in Murcia. The race was won by Adriano Baffi.

General classification

References

1995
1995 in road cycling
1995 in Spanish sport